Henry Taiporutu Te Mapu-o-te-rangi Mitchell (5 May 1877 – 5 May 1944) was a notable New Zealand Ngāti Pikiao leader, farmer, surveyor, land development supervisor and community leader. Of Māori descent, he identified with both the Ngati Pikiao and Te Arawa iwi. He was born in Ohinemutu, Rotorua/Taupo, New Zealand on 5 May 1877.

References

1877 births
1944 deaths
New Zealand farmers
Ngāti Pikiao people
Te Arawa people
New Zealand Māori public servants
New Zealand Māori farmers